Jet Set is a 2000 French comedy film, directed by Fabien Onteniente. A sequel, People, was released in 2004.

Plot
Jimmy (Bruno Solo), desperate to save his suburban bar from bankruptcy, conceives a plan to attract the "jet set", the rich and glamorous celebrities of France. He sends his friend Mike (Samuel Le Bihan), a down-at-the-heels unemployed actor, to infiltrate French high society and garner contacts with prestigious personalities to invite. Hijinks ensue.

Cast
 Samuel Le Bihan as Mickaël Gonzalvez aka « Mike »
 Lambert Wilson as Artus de Poulignac
 Ornella Muti as Camilla
 Ariadna Gil as Andréa
 Bruno Solo as Jimmy
 José Garcia as Mellor de Silva
 Aurore Clément as Nicole
 Estelle Larrivaz as Lydia
 Lorànt Deutsch as Fifi
 Elli Medeiros as Danielle Joubert
 Antoinette Moya as Mme Gonzalvez
 Guillaume Gallienne as Evrard Sainte Croix  
 Armelle as Frénégonde
 Valérie Benguigui as The Baroness
 Adel Kachermi as Himself

References

External links

Jet Set at AlloCiné 

French comedy films
2000 films
Films set in Paris
Films directed by Fabien Onteniente
2000s French films